Pteronemobius is a genus of crickets in the subfamily Nemobiinae, with a worldwide distribution.

Species
The Orthoptera Species File and Catalogue of Life list:
Unassigned subgenus
Pteronemobius ara Otte & Perez-Gelabert, 2009
Pteronemobius bagua Otte & Perez-Gelabert, 2009
Pteronemobius belteros Otte & Perez-Gelabert, 2009
Pteronemobius cantor Otte & Perez-Gelabert, 2009
Pteronemobius caryochron Otte & Perez-Gelabert, 2009
Pteronemobius eneplos Otte, 2006
Pteronemobius krakatau Otte & Cowper, 2007
Pteronemobius mime Otte & Perez-Gelabert, 2009
Pteronemobius nowinga Otte & Perez-Gelabert, 2009
Pteronemobius opia Otte & Perez-Gelabert, 2009
Pteronemobius perbonus Otte & Perez-Gelabert, 2009
Pteronemobius pinus Otte & Perez-Gelabert, 2009
Pteronemobius sanaco Otte & Perez-Gelabert, 2009
Pteronemobius setiger Otte & Perez-Gelabert, 2009
Pteronemobius tabacu Otte & Perez-Gelabert, 2009
Pteronemobius tonina Otte & Perez-Gelabert, 2009
subgenus Pteronemobius Jacobson, 1904
Pteronemobius abruptus Uvarov, 1924
Pteronemobius aethiops Saussure, 1877
Pteronemobius albolineatus Chopard, 1954
Pteronemobius ambiguus Shiraki, 1936
Pteronemobius amplipennis Chopard, 1938
Pteronemobius annulicornis Chopard, 1929
Pteronemobius aquaticus Bruner, 1916
Pteronemobius arima Otte & Alexander, 1983
Pteronemobius binnali Otte & Alexander, 1983
Pteronemobius birmanus Chopard, 1917
Pteronemobius biroi Chopard, 1927
Pteronemobius camerunensis Sjöstedt, 1900
Pteronemobius caudatus Shiraki, 1911
Pteronemobius chapadensis Bruner, 1916
Pteronemobius chopardi Bolívar, 1922
Pteronemobius crassus Chopard, 1954
Pteronemobius cristobalensis Otte & Peck, 1998
Pteronemobius dentatus Saussure, 1877
Pteronemobius dispar Chopard, 1927
Pteronemobius dumosus Karsch, 1893
Pteronemobius gagooris Otte & Alexander, 1983
Pteronemobius garrotis Otte & Alexander, 1983
Pteronemobius gorochovi Storozhenko, 2004
Pteronemobius hafferli Werner, 1905
Pteronemobius hargreavesi Chopard, 1938
Pteronemobius heydenii Fischer, 1853 - type species (as Nemobius tartarus Saussure = P. heydenii tartarus, locality: Samarkand, Uzbekistan)
Pteronemobius hirsitulus Walker, 1869
Pteronemobius indicus Walker, 1869
Pteronemobius jacobsoni Chopard, 1927
Pteronemobius kinabaluensis Ingrisch, 1987
Pteronemobius kinurae Shiraki, 1911
Pteronemobius longipennis Saussure, 1874
Pteronemobius luzonicus Bolívar, 1889
Pteronemobius maculosus Saussure, 1899
Pteronemobius majumdari Bhowmik, 1970
Pteronemobius malgachus Saussure, 1877
Pteronemobius meridionalis Bruner, 1916
Pteronemobius montanus Chopard, 1933
Pteronemobius montigenus Chopard, 1945
Pteronemobius neimongolensis Kang & Mao, 1990
Pteronemobius nigriscens Shiraki, 1911
Pteronemobius nigritus Saussure, 1877
Pteronemobius nigrofasciatus Matsumura, 1904
Pteronemobius nitidus Bolívar, 1901
Pteronemobius novarae Saussure, 1877
Pteronemobius nundra Otte & Alexander, 1983 (species group)
Pteronemobius obscurior Chopard, 1957
Pteronemobius occidentalis Chopard, 1937
Pteronemobius ohmachii Shiraki, 1930
Pteronemobius ornaticeps Chopard, 1925 (species group)
Pteronemobius pantelchopardorum Shishodia & Varshney, 1987
Pteronemobius panteli Hebard, 1913
Pteronemobius paranae Saussure, 1874
Pteronemobius picinus Walker, 1869
Pteronemobius pilicornis Chopard, 1969
Pteronemobius qinghaiensis Yin, 1998
Pteronemobius quadrilineatus Chopard, 1955
Pteronemobius regulus Saussure, 1877 (species group)
Pteronemobius ruficeps Chopard, 1962
Pteronemobius rufipes Chopard, 1969
Pteronemobius rufus Saussure, 1877
Pteronemobius santacruzensis Otte & Peck, 1998
Pteronemobius schunkei Chopard, 1956
Pteronemobius sjostedti Chopard, 1934
Pteronemobius subapterus Chopard, 1957
Pteronemobius sulfurariae Chopard, 1932
Pteronemobius tagalicus Bolívar, 1889
Pteronemobius taibaiensis Deng & Xu, 2006
Pteronemobius tarrios Otte & Alexander, 1983
Pteronemobius trispinosus Chopard, 1958
Pteronemobius truncatus Saussure, 1877 (species group)
Pteronemobius truncates Zhang, Wang & Liu, 2020
Pteronemobius unicolor Chopard, 1925
Pteronemobius warrakarra Otte & Alexander, 1983 (species group)
Pteronemobius yezoensis Shiraki, 1911
Pteronemobius yunnanicus Li, He & Liu, 2010
subgenus Stilbonemobius Gorochov, 1984
Pteronemobius kurtshevae Gorochov, 1986
Pteronemobius lineolatus Brullé, 1835
Pteronemobius longispinus Gorochov, 1984
Pteronemobius minutus Bolívar, 1910
Pteronemobius monochromus Chopard, 1955
Pteronemobius niveipalpus Sjöstedt, 1910
Pteronemobius pseudotaprobanensis Gorochov, 1984
Pteronemobius troitzkyi Gorochov, 1984

References

External links
 

Orthoptera genera
Ensifera